Mage: The Awakening is a tabletop role-playing game originally published by White Wolf Publishing on August 29, 2005, and is the third game in their Chronicles of Darkness series. The characters portrayed in this game are individuals able to bend or break the commonly accepted rules of reality to perform subtle or outlandish acts of magic. These characters are broadly referred to as "mages".

Background and setting
As with the other games in the Chronicles of Darkness, the history presented in the game provides for some ambiguity. However, the "origin story" of magic and mages is less ambiguous (or at least given more lip-service) than that of vampires or werewolves.

In the mythic past, a mysterious island existed with a single towering mountain, encircled by dragons that lived upon its summit. The mountain called to humanity through dreams and visions. Over time, the dragons left and the mountain continued to call. Some humans answered the call and sought it out. The humans who moved there discovered the first secrets of magic, and through magic they created the mighty city-state now known as Atlantis, Meru, Lemuria, etc. though its true name has been lost to time.

Over time, the mages became filled with hubris, and began fighting over how best to lead the world. The battle separated the Earth into the Fallen World and the Supernal Realm, with the chasm of the Abyss in between. The Fallen World is the world where humanity now exists, and the Supernal realm is the realm of magic, where the victorious mages of long ago now reside. The Abyss that separates the two worlds prevents most of humanity from awakening to magic and hampers the power of mages trapped in the Fallen World.

Mages believe that the Supernal Realm is the truth of reality and the origin of magic. It is ruled by the Exarchs, powerful mages who have established themselves as its rulers. The Exarchs wish to snuff out the memory of "Atlantis" and knowledge of magic so that they will remain the supreme masters of reality. They are more godlike forces than human beings now; however, this means that they must influence the Fallen World through servants.

Resistance against the Exarchs is possible because of the Oracles, a small number (probably five) of Atlantean mages who also reached the Supernal Realm. They each created (or maybe are) one of the Watchtowers, which are locations in the Supernal Realms that can cut through the Abyss. They serve as paths towards magic, allowing Sleepers (humans unaware of magic) to awaken to it. Each mage visits a Watchtower during their Awakening—through means perhaps accidental, or perhaps resulting from a person's nature or understanding—and their magical abilities are forever affected by that journey.

Fragments of the organizations, artifacts and writings from the First City survive to the present day, and mages hope to use this knowledge to further their various causes, by gaining a stronger connection to the Supernal Realm.

Characters

The process of awakening can be slow or fast, but there are two major ways in which the event may manifest: the Mystery Play (in which the mage's senses blur the real world and the magical symbolism of their awakening) and the Astral Journey (which takes place entirely within a dreamscape of the prospective mage). In both sorts of "awakenings", the mage-to-be goes on a journey that culminates with them arriving at or in their respective Tower and inscribing their name upon it.

Paths and Orders
There are five Paths of Magic that have a sympathetic connection to one of the Five Watchtowers, each with a particular style and focus. A Mage's Path is decided with his or her awakening.

 Acanthus:  Enchanters who work with luck, intuition and destiny.
 Mastigos: Warlocks who work with perception and inner demons.
 Moros: Necromancers who work with death, mortality and material things.
 Obrimos: Theurgists who work with the divine and mundane energies infusing the world.
 Thyrsus: Shamans who work with all aspects of the natural world.

After awakening, a mage typically joins one of the five Orders, although some choose to remain free of political connections, or remain outside of mage society due to ignorance, and are called apostates. The Five Orders are united in their opposition to the Exarchs, and four claim a heritage going back to the First City.

 The Adamantine Arrow: spiritual warriors and masters of conflict, who claim a heritage going back to the First City's defenders. Currently, the Order of the Arrow could perhaps be described as something akin to a knightly sect, though bushido and other warrior codes find a place in The Arrow.  These mages conduct intensive physical and mental training, honing the minds and bodies of other members into deadly weapons which magical society may then wield against its enemies (such as vampires, werewolves, Seers of the Throne, and so on).
 Guardians of the Veil: spies and conspirators who claim their descent from the intelligence officers and enforcers of the First City's laws. Currently, they bear a resemblance to a combination of many occult conspiracies, such as the Thule. Many obscure their activities and identities even from other mages, and act as a check on humanity's dangerous curiosity for "that which man was not meant to know".
 The Mysterium: dedicated to pursuit of magical lore and the acquisition, cataloguing, and study of mystical and occult knowledge and artifacts. The "mystagogues" (as they are called) continue the ancient heritage of the scholarly and intellectual of Atlantean society. Their internal structure often resembles the academic structures of the part of the world in which they reside. The Mysterium gathers, catalogues and maintains items of all types of magical and historical significance. 
 The Silver Ladder: dedicated to ruling, guiding and reshaping the world, the viziers, senators and priests of the First City remain in force.  Politicians and authoritarians, the théarchs believe in creating a perfect hierarchy (with themselves at the top, of course) which will seize control of reality, subjugating it to the will of mankind; this dream is not without its altruistic appeal. As a member of the Ladder might point out, control over reality could bring an end to human suffering in all its forms. 
 The Free Council: modernists who wish to create new forms of magic, a union of mages who have discovered ways of using magic that do not adhere to the Atlantean methods, joining the other orders during the Industrial Revolution after their previous form rejected an offer from the Seers. The "Libertines", as they are also called, possess a strong belief in democratic process and anti-authoritarianism.

The Orders have competing agendas and opposing beliefs, leading to a lack of cooperation and trust, however this does not lead to open warfare between the Orders. When enemies of the Orders, such as the Seers of the Throne, appear, the Orders put aside their differences, as their squabbles are petty compared to the battle between the Oracles and the Exarchs.

Legacies
Legacies are an optional third grouping, literally portrayed as refinements of one's soul that are passed on from master to student. These grant additional innate benefits, including abilities and gifts called Attainments, which are exempt from the usual Paradox. Certain Legacies exist—which might practice unwholesome arts such as necromancy or infernalism, or perhaps simply espouse political views that are unpopular amongst local mages—known as Left-Handed Legacies. They are largely meant as antagonists rather than player characters. Many who practice these have a low Wisdom score, representing a progressive moral decline that comes from practicing them.

Magic

Magic is simply the ability of a mage (or "willworker") to impose their will onto reality. Mages are able to do this because of their sympathetic connection to the Watchtowers in the Supernal Realms, because their names are inscribed upon it, and because they realize the Fallen World is a lie.

A mage's power, or level of awakening and understanding of the depths of the Supernal, is called Gnosis.

Arcana represent the understanding a mage has over particular facets of reality, and govern their ability to affect those aspects. Subtle Arcana (Death, Fate, Mind, Prime, and Spirit) are those that deal with the more ephemeral matters of existence, while Gross Arcana (Forces, Life, Matter, Space, and Time) are those relating to the physical aspects of the world.

Covert and Vulgar Spells
Covert spells are those that do not outwardly appear magical, and therefore do not automatically risk backfiring (called Paradox), while Vulgar spells are unmistakably magical, and risk backfiring. All spells have a greater risk of Paradox when they are cast in the presence of Sleepers, or non-Awakened humans. Supernatural beings, or humans that have some hint of the supernatural about them (i.e. Ghouls, Sleepwalkers, and Wolfblooded) do not contribute to Paradox.

Antagonists

Seers of the Throne: The Seers are Awakened who have sworn service to the Exarchs. They claim to follow the will of the Exarchs, and seek to remove magic from the world, enforce power structures that support unquestioning obedience, and strengthen the Lie. Seers believe that an Exarch is a man-made-god, and serve them in the hopes that once they succeed in destroying those that oppose them they will be rewarded by their distant masters. 
The Banishers: Banishers are warped Mages who dedicate themselves to destroying other Mages. Generally speaking, their Awakening was traumatic, undesired, and misunderstood, and they do not accept their mystical powers. They exist outside of normal mage society, and are often obsessed with hunting and killing other mages, usually driven by a desire for repentance or a belief that doing so will cause their life to be returned to normal.
The Mad: Mad are Mages whose Awakening caused them to lose their minds, rendering them insane mystics who use their magic for their own mad ends. 
The Acamoth / The Gulmoth: The monstrous, alien beings that originate beyond the threshold of existence, in the Abyssal gulf between the Supernal Realm and the Fallen World. Because of their nature, they are incapable of contacting or having any power in either the Supernal or Fallen World, and as such they require agents to grant them potency. Gulmoth are the entities that normally reside in the Abyss until summoned either by catastrophic Paradox or deliberate summoning by insane or desperate mages, existing only for a time in the Fallen World to further the Abyss' overall goal of destroying the cosmos. Acamoth are those Abyssal beings that have somehow become trapped in the cosmos, and offer mages pacts in return for using their souls as vessels to mentally journey back to their home - a proposition that deeply threatens their sanity.
The Scelesti: Mortal mages who serve/worship the Abyss are known as "Scelesti" (sing. Scelestus), or simply "The Wicked". They serve the "Divine Purity" of the Abyss and seek the end of all things. They are hunted as heretics and abominations by all other Mages.
 Goetic Demons: Goetia is a practice that mages use that summons the vices of their minds into a physical form, in the belief that it will make them possible to subdue, or even destroy. Quite often, however, a Goetic mage will summon an "inner demon" that is too powerful for him to defeat, and it will escape, or even take control of the overconfident mage. 
Tremere Liches: A Left-Handed Legacy of Liches who consume the souls of others in exchange for immortality and power. Their name and origins are a reference to the clan of the same name, from the old World of Darkness vampire game.
Witch Hunters: Mortals who seek out and destroy mages for ideological reasons.

Production and release
Mage: The Awakening was published by White Wolf Publishing on August 29, 2005, as a 400-page hardcover book, following a pre-release sale at the gaming convention Gen Con on August 18–21. The game had originally been planned to be released two weeks earlier, but was delayed as developer Bill Bridges and the game design team wanted to refine and further detail the game's magic system, adding 80 pages of content in the process. Fantasy artist Michael Kaluta was the sole artist for the core rulebook's interior art, drawing over 100 illustrations for it.

Books

First edition (2005–2013)

Second edition (2016–present)

Related media
White Wolf Publishing released an adaptation of Mage: The Awakening by Eddy Webb for the live-action role-playing game Mind's Eye Theatre in 2007.

Reception
Mage: The Awakening won the 2006 Gold ENnie Award for "Best Writing".

Reviews
Pyramid

References

External links
 

Chronicles of Darkness
ENnies winners
Role-playing games introduced in 2005